The Concerto for Piano and Orchestra is a piano concerto by the American composer John Corigliano.  The work was commissioned by the San Antonio Symphony and was first performed on April 7, 1968 by the pianist Hilde Somer and the San Antonio Symphony under the direction of Victor Alessandro.  The piece is dedicated to John Atkins.

Composition

Structure
The concerto has a duration of roughly 32 minutes and is composed in four movements:
Molto allegro
Scherzo
Andante appassionato
Allegro

The first movement Molto allegro is composed in sonata form.  The third and fourth movements are played without pause.

Instrumentation
The work is scored for solo piano and a large orchestra comprising three flutes (doubling piccolo) three oboes (doubling cor anglais), three clarinets (doubling bass clarinet), two bassoons, contrabassoon, four horns, three trumpets, three trombones, tuba, timpani, three percussionists, harp, and strings.

Reception
Though the concerto was largely overlooked after its 1968 premiere, it has since grown in popularity.  Corigliano himself was reportedly upset with the initial disinterest in the work, about which the music critic Stephen Wigler later wrote, "One can still understand Corigliano's distress. Here was a more than 30-minute-long concerto that promised satisfaction to virtuosos and audiences alike; and it was spiky enough in its Bartokian way to dispel the guilty pleasures that ensued from its sometimes Rachmaninoff-like, sometimes Mahler-like lyricism."  Reviewing a 1996 recording of the work, Edward Greenfield of Gramophone called it "a powerful and ambitious work in four sharply contrasted movements."  He continued:

Recordings
Barry Douglas (piano), Leonard Slatkin (conductor), Saint Louis Symphony Orchestra (1996)

See also
List of compositions by John Corigliano

References

Concertos by John Corigliano
1968 compositions
Corigliano
Music commissioned by the San Antonio Symphony